Just Reality is the second solo studio album by Jamaican dancehall/reggae recording artist Shabba Ranks. It was released in 1990 via VP Records, and produced by Bobby "Digital" Dixon.

This album did not receive as many good reviews as its predecessor, however, it did include the huge hit "Wicked Inna Bed" and the hugely influential track "Dem Bow", which went on to be instrumental in the birth of reggaeton as a genre.

Track listing

References

External links

1991 albums
Shabba Ranks albums